Frank Mkalawile Chipasula (born 16 October 1949) is a Malawian writer, editor and university professor, "easily one of the best of the known writers in the discourse of Malawian letters".

Life
Born in Luanshya, Northern Rhodesia, Frank Chipasula attended St. Peter's Primary School on Likoma Island, Soche Hill Day Secondary School, Malosa Secondary School, Chancellor College, University of Malawi, and, finally, the Great East Road Campus of the University of Zambia, Lusaka, where he graduated B.A., in exile, in 1976. Before leaving Malawi, Chipasula had worked as a freelance broadcaster for the Malawi Broadcasting Corporation while studying English and French at the university. In Lusaka, he served as English Editor for the National Education Company of Zambia, his first publishers, following his graduation from the University of Zambia.

In 1978 Chipasula went into exile in the United States as a result of the Hastings Banda government, studying for his M.A. in Creative Writing at Brown University, a second M.A. in African American Studies at Yale University and gaining a Ph.D in English literature from Brown University in 1987. Previously a professor of Black Studies at the University of Nebraska at Omaha and Howard University, Chipasula has also worked as the education attache at the Malawian embassy in Washington, D.C. His first book, Visions and Reflections (1972), is also the first published poetry volume in English by a Malawian writer. As well as poetry, which has been widely anthologised, he has written radio plays and fiction.

Since January 10, 1976, Chipasula has been married to Stella, a former school teacher, whom he met in Mulanje, Malawi, in 1972. They have two grown children, James Masauko Mgeni Akuzike and Helen Chipo.

Achievements
 Honourable mention Noma Award, 1985
 BBC Poetry Prize, 1989
In 2018, Frank Chipasula organized the Women's Poetry Festival in Malawi

Works
 Visions and Reflections, Lusaka: NEZCAM, 1972.
 O Earth, Wait for Me, Johannesburg: Ravan Press, 1984.
 (ed.) When My Brothers Come Home: Poems from Central and Southern Africa, Middletown, Conn.: Wesleyan University Press; Scranton, Pa.: Distributed by Harper & Row, 1985.
 Nightwatcher, Bightsong, Peterborough: P. Green, 1986.
 Whispers in the Wings: Poems, Heinemann, 1991. African Writers Series.
 A Decade in Poetry, Lusaka: Kenneth Kaunda Foundation, 1991.
 (ed. with Stella Chipasula) The Heinemann Book of African Women's Poetry, Heinemann, 1995.
 On the Shoulders of the Mountain: A Selection of Poems, 2007.
 (ed.) Bending the Bow: An Anthology of African Love Poetry, Carbondale: Southern Illinois University Press, 2009.

References

 Biography with picture at creighton.edu
 Biography at the African People Database

1949 births
Living people
Malawian writers
Malawian academics
Brown University alumni
Yale Graduate School of Arts and Sciences alumni
University of Zambia alumni
University of Malawi alumni
People from Luanshya
University of Nebraska Omaha faculty
Howard University faculty